The Peer Gynt Road (Norway: Peer Gynt Vegen) is a 60-kilometre-long tourist mountain road, named for the folkloric character Per Gynt. It is a toll road. It runs in the east of Norway in Innlandet county with views of Jotunheimen, along the villages Skeikampen, Fagerhøy, Gålå, Fefor and Dalseter.

The road is only open in the summer, mostly from 1 June, and is closed when the snow starts.

External links 
Peer Gynt Vegen
Information (pdf-bestand, 2,3 MB)
Fagerhøy

Roads in Innlandet